Ken Adam (11 August 1900 – 23 July 1968) was an Australian rules footballer who played with Essendon in the Victorian Football League (VFL).

Notes

External links
		

1900 births
1968 deaths
Australian rules footballers from Victoria (Australia)
Essendon Football Club players